Confederate Units of Indian Territory consisted of Native Americans from the Five Civilized Tribes — the Cherokee, Chickasaw, Choctaw, Creek, and Seminole nations. The 1st Cherokee Mounted Rifles were commanded by the highest ranking Native American of the war: Brig. Gen. Stand Watie, who also became the last Confederate General to surrender on June 23, 1865. There was also a series of Union units of Indian Territory.

Cherokee Nation
1st Cherokee Mounted Rifles
1st Regiment of Cherokee Mounted Volunteers 
2nd Regiment of Cherokee Mounted Volunteers
3rd Cherokee Regiment of Volunteer Cavalry 
Cherokee Regiment (Special Services), CSA 
1st Cherokee Battalion of Partisan Rangers 
2nd Cherokee Artillery
Cherokee Special Services Battalion 
Scales' Battalion of Cherokee Cavalry 
Meyer's Battalion of Cherokee Cavalry 
Cherokee Battalion of Infantry
1st Squadron of Cherokee Mounted Volunteers

Creek Nation
1st Regiment Creek Mounted Volunteers 
2nd Regiment Creek Mounted Volunteers
1st Battalion Creek Confederate Cavalry

Seminole Nation
1st Regiment Seminole Mounted Volunteers
1st Battalion Seminole Mounted Volunteers

Chickasaw Nation
1st Regiment of Chickasaw Infantry 
1st Regiment of Chickasaw Cavalry 
1st Battalion of Chickasaw Cavalry 
Shecoe's Chickasaw Battalion of Mounted Volunteers

Choctaw Nation
1st Choctaw & Chickasaw Mounted Rifles
1st Regiment of Choctaw Mounted Rifles
2nd Regiment of Choctaw Cavalry 
3rd Regiment of Choctaw Cavalry 
Deneale's Regiment of Choctaw Warriors
Folsom's Battalion of Choctaw Mounted Rifles 
Capt. John Wilkin's Company of Choctaw Infantry

Northwest Frontier Command of Indian Territory 
(Col. Roswell W. Lee, Commanding) 
1st Osage Battalion
Major George Washington's Frontier Battalion 
Major James W. Cooper's Battalion

References

See also
Indian Territory in the American Civil War
Lists of American Civil War Regiments by State
Confederate Units by State

 
Lists of military units and formations of the American Civil War